Leleasca is a commune in Olt County, Muntenia, Romania. It is composed of seven villages: Afumați, Greerești, Leleasca, Mierlicești, Tonești, Tufaru and Urși.

References

Communes in Olt County
Localities in Muntenia